This is the order of battle for the French Army on the outbreak of war in August 1914.

Background 

In 1914, the French War strategy was based on the offensive Plan XVII, which aimed to attack in Alsace-Lorraine.
Therefore, the right wing of the French Army was stronger than the left wing.

Order of battle
1) First Army, commanded by Auguste Dubail
 Concentration zone : between Remiremont and Charmes
 Mission : attack towards Mulhouse and Sarrebourg 
 Strength : 5 Corps. 266,452 men

2) Second Army, commanded by Édouard de Castelnau
 Concentration zone : between Pont-Saint-Vincent and Neufchâteau, Vosges
 Mission : attack towards Morhange
 Strength : 5 Corps. 323,445 men

3) Third Army, commanded by Pierre Ruffey
 Concentration zone : between Saint-Mihiel and Verdun
 Mission : Hold the Germans in their defensive positions before Metz
 Strength : 3 Corps. 237,257 men

4) Fourth Army, commanded by Fernand de Langle de Cary
 Concentration zone : between Saint-Dizier and Bar-le-Duc
 Mission : In reserve in the Argonne Region
 Strength : 3 Corps. 159,588 men

5) Fifth Army, commanded by Charles Lanrezac
 Concentration zone : between Hirson and Dun-sur-Meuse
 Mission : Guard the Southern part of the border with Belgium
 Strength : 5 Corps. 299,350 men

6) Cavalry Corps, commanded by André Sordet
 Concentration zone : around Mézières
 Mission : Advance into the Belgian Ardennes in case of a German attack on Belgium.
 Strength : 15,750 men

1914 in France
France in World War I
World War I orders of battle
Military units and formations of France in World War I
Military history of France